Bıyıklı may refer to:

 Bıyıklı, Bayramiç
 Bıyıklı, Döşemealtı
 Bıyıklı, Koçarlı